Orio al Serio is a comune (municipality) in the Province of Bergamo in the Italian region of Lombardy, located about  northeast of Milan and about  southeast of Bergamo.

Orio al Serio Airport is located in the territory of the village.

Orio is also home to the Orio Center, one of the largest shopping malls in Europe.

References

External links

 Commune of Orio al Serio